Dhanera is one of the 182 Legislative Assembly constituencies of Gujarat state in India. It is part of Banaskantha district. It is numbered as 9-Dhanera.

List of segments
This assembly seat represents the following segments,

 Dhanera Taluka
 Palanpur Taluka (Part) Village – Jorapura Bhakhar
 Dantiwada Taluka

Members of Legislative Assembly

Election candidate

2022

Election results

2017

2012

2007

2002

1998

1995

1990

1985

1980

1975

1972

1967

1962

See also
 List of constituencies of the Gujarat Legislative Assembly
 Banaskantha district

References

External links
 

Assembly constituencies of Gujarat
Politics of Banaskantha district